Titanoceros mirandalis is a species of snout moth. It is found in China.

References

Moths described in 1925
Epipaschiinae